Haley Loraine Keeling (born January 7, 1988), known professionally as Haley Bennett, is an American actress. She made her film debut in the romantic comedy Music and Lyrics (2007) and has since appeared in films such as The Equalizer (2014), The Girl on the Train (2016), The Magnificent Seven (2016), Thank You for Your Service (2017), Swallow (2019), Hillbilly Elegy (2020), Cyrano (2021) and Till (2022).

Early life
Bennett was born Haley Loraine Keeling in Fort Myers, Florida, on January 7, 1988. Her parents, Leilani ( Dorsey Bennett) and Ronald Keeling, met in church and hitchhiked to Florida while Leilani was pregnant with her. She is of English, German, Irish, Lithuanian, and Scottish descent. She was raised in Naples, Florida. Her parents divorced when she was six years old and she moved to Ohio with her father, who opened an automobile repair shop there. They moved regularly around the state, with Bennett later saying, "There was no time when I lived anywhere longer than two years. I was always a social outcast. Maybe I didn't care what people thought because I [thought], 'Well, I probably won't stick around here for too long.'" Bennett describes her childhood as "nomadic", as she moved between living with her father in Ohio and her mother in Florida:

When Bennett was 10, she and her father moved to Stow, Ohio, where she attended Stow-Munroe Falls High School. At 13, she enrolled at Barbizon Modeling School in Akron, Ohio. She attended the International Modeling and Talent Convention in 2001 and 2006, where she won a major award, acted in school plays, and sang in choirs. She also lived with her mother in Naples occasionally, where she attended Barron G. Collier High School, and studied music and acting. When Bennett was 18, she persuaded her mother to take her to Los Angeles for three months to pursue an acting career. Just as she was about to return home, she managed to secure representation by claiming to her prospective agent that a highly regarded agency had approached her; the agent refused to lose Bennett and signed her. She began using her mother's maiden name as her stage name.

Career

In what was only her third audition, Bennett won the role of popstar Cora Corman for her film debut in the 2007 romantic comedy Music and Lyrics. She sang several songs for the film's soundtrack, including "Buddha's Delight" and "Way Back into Love"; fragments of the songs "Entering Bootytown" and "Slam" are heard during concert scenes in the film, and her song "Invincible" plays during the end credits. That same year, she signed with 550 Music/NuSound Records (part Epic Records), and began working on her debut album, though one was never released. Bennett performed her first live concert at The Mint in Los Angeles on June 19, 2008. Despite the auspicious film debut, Bennett did not break through.

After signing a three-picture deal with Warner Bros. (beginning with Music and Lyrics), Bennett subsequently starred in her second and third films, the comedy College (2008) and the supernatural horror The Haunting of Molly Hartley (2008). Also in 2008, she made a cameo appearance in Marley & Me. The following year, Bennett had a lead role alongside Julia Stiles in Shekhar Kapur's short film Passage. She then co-starred as Julie Campbell in the horror thriller film The Hole, directed by Joe Dante. In 2010, she appeared in the fantasy comedy Kaboom, and the drama Arcadia Lost. In July 2010, Bennett was cast in the FX crime-drama series Outlaw Country alongside Luke Grimes, Mary Steenburgen and John Hawkes. The pilot was filmed in 2010 before a rewrite and reshoots in April 2011. It remained in limbo until November 2011, when FX announced that it had not been picked up for a series. The hour-and-a-half long pilot was broadcast as a TV film on August 24, 2012.

Bennett then landed the lead in the thriller film Kristy (2014). She next appeared in the independent drama film Lost in the White City (2014), alongside Thomas Dekker and Bob Morley. Also in 2014, Bennett appeared in The Equalizer with Denzel Washington and Melissa Leo. In 2015, Bennett starred in Ilya Naishuller's first-person point-of-view film Hardcore Henry. 

In 2016, she appeared as Emma Cullen in Antoine Fuqua's The Magnificent Seven, co-starred as Megan Hipwell in the Tate Taylor-directed film adaptation of Paula Hawkins' thriller novel The Girl on the Train, and played actress Mamie Murphy in Warren Beatty's comedy-drama Rules Don't Apply. Responses to the first two films were mixed, while the third was more positively received; Bennett's performances were praised in all three. In 2017, Bennett played Saskia Schumann in Jason Hall's PTSD drama film Thank You for Your Service. She had also been cast in Terrence Malick's musical drama film Song to Song, alongside Christian Bale, but her scenes were later cut. 

In 2019, she starred in and produced the psychological thriller Swallow, directed by Carlos Mirabella-Davis, revolving around a woman with pica. It had its world premiere at the Tribeca Film Festival in April 2019, where Bennett received the award for Best Actress. Her performance in the film received rave reviews from critics calling it "pitch-perfect", "extraordinary", and "masterful". That same year, she starred in The Red Sea Diving Resort directed by Gideon Raff, opposite Chris Evans. In 2020, she co-starred in two adaptations of books: the drama thriller The Devil All the Time, directed by Antonio Campos and based upon the novel of the same name; and Hillbilly Elegy, directed by Ron Howard, both for Netflix.

Bennett starred in the 2021 film Cyrano and joined Whoopi Goldberg in the drama film Till which was written and directed by Chinonye Chukwu. She will next appear in Eli Roth's Borderlands, an adaptation of the video game of the same name, and star in and produce the feature adaptation of Brood the bestselling debut novel of author Jackie Polzin.

Personal life
Since 2017, Bennett has been in a relationship with English film director Joe Wright. Their daughter was born December 27, 2018. As of 2019, the family reside in the United Kingdom in Bruton, Somerset.

Filmography

Film

Short film

References

External links

 

1988 births
21st-century American women singers
21st-century American actresses
550 Music artists
Actresses from Florida
American child actresses
American expatriate actresses in the United Kingdom
American expatriates in England
American film actresses
American people of English descent
American people of German descent
American people of Irish descent
American people of Lithuanian descent
American people of Scottish descent
Living people
People from Fort Myers, Florida
People from Naples, Florida
People from Stow, Ohio
People from Brooklyn Heights